One male athlete from Luxembourg competed at the 1996 Summer Paralympics in Atlanta, United States.

See also
Luxembourg at the Paralympics
Luxembourg at the 1996 Summer Olympics

References 

Nations at the 1996 Summer Paralympics
1996
Summer Paralympics